Ugna is the incarnation of Lord Shiva as the servant of his devotee Maithili poet Vidyapati around 6th decades of 14th century in Mithila.

Mythological Story 

It is believed that Lord Shiva was so pleased and fascinated with the devotion of Vidyapati to him, he decided to meet the poet on the earth in human incarnation  as Ugna. Lord Shiva took the incarnation in human being wearing custum like servant. He reached the house of the poet Vidyapati in search of jobs. He met the poet and asked for job at his home. But Vidyapati was not so prosperous by wealth to provide job for him. Then Ugna agreed to work at the poet house on cost of two times daily food. Once a time Vidyapati was going to the king Shiv Singh court for meeting with the king in a very hot summer, then he felt very thirsty for water and asked Ugna to bring some water. Ugna went few distances out of the sight of Vidyapati and full his lota with Gangajal from his Jatta. Then he came back to Vidyapati and give the full lota of water to the poet to drink the water. When Vidyapati drank the water, he felt the taste of the water as Gangajal. After drinking the water, Vidyapati looked around at a far distance in search of the source of the water but he found no such source of water around him and  he astonished. Then he asked Ugna to show the source of water but Ugna was unable to show the source of the water. Then Vidyapati prayed to Ugna and asked him to clearify his true identity. After many appeals from Vidyapati Ugna finally showed his true identity as Lord Shiva. Then the Lord Shiva asked Vidyapati to promise him not to reveal his true identity to anyone and Vidyapati agreed to not reveal his true identity to anyone. But one day the wife of the poet was very angry with Ugna and tried to beat him by burning wood. Vidyapati saw this incident and suddenly revealed the true identity of Ugna to stop his wife from beating him by the burning wood. And then Ugna showing his true identity disappeared from there forever.

Related Places 
Bhavanipur, Madhubani: It is said that, Ugna appeared in the form Lord Shiva infront of Vidyapati at Bhavanipur village of Madhubani district in Mithila region of Bihar.

Bisfi, Madhubani: Similarly it is believed that Lord Shiva took the incarnation of Ugna at Bisfi village of Madhubani district in Mithila region of Bihar. It is also the birth place of Vidyapati.

References 

Forms of Shiva
Shaivism